Epistemma is a genus of flowering plants belonging to the family Apocynaceae.

Its native range is Western Tropical Africa to Uganda.

Species:

Epistemma assianum 
Epistemma decurrens 
Epistemma neuerburgii 
Epistemma rupestre

References

Apocynaceae
Apocynaceae genera